A practice pad or drum pad, is a piece of equipment used by drummers and other percussionists to practice quietly, or to warm up before a performance.

Construction
A variety of practice pads have been developed to assist percussionists in different ways. Practice pads may be designed to approximate the tension and response of a true drumhead when struck, or to provide less rebound to train the percussionist’s muscles. They can be constructed in a variety of shapes and sizes, and are typically small and light enough to be easily portable. Many variations include harder or softer playing surfaces, non-skid bases (that can also double as muted playing surfaces), and fixing points allowing the pad to be connected to existing percussion hardware such as a cymbal or snare drum stand.

Mylar
Some practice pads use a disk of mylar, or another material used in the construction of true drumheads, stretched over a substrate such as foam or rubber. These elements are fixed together by a rim of metal or plastic.

Elastomer
Many other devices use a thin layer of elastomer, such as natural or synthetic rubber of various densities, as a playing surface. This type of rubber surface is either placed directly over the top of an existing drumhead, or stuck to the top of a solid substrate. The rubber is designed to reflect a drumstick or mallet after being struck in a way similar to that of a true drumhead.

Mesh
Some practice pads use a disk of mesh stretched over a frame. The mesh is quieter when struck than rubber or mylar, and can be tuned to mimic different types of drum head by tightening and loosening it in the frame.

Use
These devices can be placed on a wide variety of surfaces including the player’s lap, a tabletop or the head of an actual drum. Placing the pad on the head of an actual drum can have the effect of transferring to the drum’s natural snare-side response along with severely muting the sound of the drum. Several units are often arranged like a standard drum kit or practice purposes.

See also
Electronic drum
Practice (learning method)
Rehearsal

References

Drumming